Covenant Classical Academy is a classical Christian school in Louisville, Kentucky. It was founded in 1997 and offers education for K-12.

Covenant Classical Academy is a member of the Association of Classical and Christian Schools.

References

External links
 

1997 establishments in Kentucky
Christian schools in Kentucky
Classical Christian schools
Educational institutions established in 1997
High schools in Louisville, Kentucky
Private high schools in Kentucky